Eupithecia lusoria is a moth in the family Geometridae. It is found in Nepal.

The wingspan is about 15 mm.

References

Moths described in 2010
lusoria
Moths of Asia